Rotenhain is an Ortsgemeinde – a community belonging to a Verbandsgemeinde – in the Westerwaldkreis in Rhineland-Palatinate, Germany. Since 1972 it has belonged to what was then the newly founded Verbandsgemeinde of Westerburg, a kind of collective municipality. Its seat is in the like-named town.

Geography

Rotenhain lies 9 km southwest of Westerburg.

Politics

The municipal council is made up of 13 council members, including the extraofficial mayor (Bürgermeister), who were elected in a majority vote in a municipal election on 13 June 2004.

Economy and infrastructure

Southwest of the community runs Bundesstraße 255, leading from Montabaur to Herborn. The nearest Autobahn interchange is Montabaur on the A 3 (Cologne–Frankfurt). Rotenhain lies on the Oberwesterwaldbahn (railway) to Limburg and Au (Sieg). From there, the cities of Cologne, Koblenz, Frankfurt am Main and Wiesbaden may be reached directly. The nearest InterCityExpress stop is the railway station at Montabaur on the Cologne-Frankfurt high-speed rail line.

References

External links
 Rotenhain in the collective municipality’s Web pages 

Municipalities in Rhineland-Palatinate
Westerwaldkreis